Selwyn Jalil Lymon (born September 21, 1986) is a former American football wide receiver. He was signed by the Miami Dolphins as an undrafted free agent in 2008. He played college football at Purdue.

High school career
As a high school athlete, Lymon excelled in two sports.  His ability in football enabled him to sign a scholarship to play at Purdue.  In basketball, his excellence led to Lymon being named a recipient of the Tiffany Gooden Award, given annually to the most outstanding male or female basketball player in the SAC.

Personal
Lymon is a cousin of NFL safety Bernard Pollard.

External links
Purdue Boilermakers bio

1986 births
Living people
Players of American football from Fort Wayne, Indiana
American football wide receivers
Purdue Boilermakers football players
Miami Dolphins players